Parabothus chlorospilus is a species of flatfish in the family Bothidae.

References 

Bothidae
Taxa named by Charles Henry Gilbert
Animals described in 1905